Tucker Murphy (born October 21, 1981) is an American-born British cross-country skier who represents the British Overseas territory of Bermuda and has competed since 2006. He finished 88th in the 15 km event at the 2010 Winter Olympics in Vancouver, British Columbia. He studied at Dartmouth College and Merton College, Oxford.

Murphy's best career finish was 11th in a lesser-known event at Spain in 2009.

References

External links

Bernews: Tucker Murphy Bio, Photo Gallery, Video

1981 births
Sportspeople from Dallas
Bermudian male cross-country skiers
Cross-country skiers at the 2010 Winter Olympics
Cross-country skiers at the 2014 Winter Olympics
Cross-country skiers at the 2018 Winter Olympics
Living people
Alumni of Merton College, Oxford
Olympic cross-country skiers of Bermuda
Triathletes at the 2014 Commonwealth Games
Commonwealth Games competitors for Bermuda
Bermudian people of American descent